Entente Bagneaux-Fontainebleau-Nemours was a football club located in the towns of Bagneaux-sur-Loing, Fontainebleau, and Nemours in France. It was founded in 1966 as a result of the merger between AS Bagneaux-Nemours and CS Fontainebleau. However, it split in 1978, and CS Fontainebleau returned to its former name. The successor of AS Bagneaux-Nemours is Entente Bagneaux-Nemours-Saint-Pierre.

The club played in the Championnat de France Amateur from 1966 to 1970 and in the Division 2 from 1970 to 1978.

Notable former players 

  Jean-Pierre Adams
  Bernard Béréau
  Jean-Louis Brost
  Robert Corfou
  Philippe Mahut
  Christian Quéré

Honours

References 

Defunct football clubs in France
Association football clubs established in 1966
1966 establishments in France
Association football clubs established in 1978
1978 establishments in France
Sport in Seine-et-Marne
Football clubs in Île-de-France